The Ford Motor Company produced straight-six engines from 1906 until 1908 and from 1941 until 2016. In 1906, the first Ford straight-six was introduced in the Model K. The next was introduced in the 1941 Ford. Ford continued producing straight-six engines for use in its North American vehicles until 1996, when they were discontinued in favor of more compact V6 designs.

Ford Australia also manufactured straight-six engines in Australia for the Falcon and Territory models until 2016, when both vehicle lines were discontinued. Following the closure of the Australian engine plant, Ford no longer produces a straight-six gasoline engine.

First generation 
The first-generation Ford six-cylinder engines were all flatheads. They were the G- and H-series engines of  used in cars and trucks and the M-series of  used in larger Ford trucks and for industrial applications.

226
Introduced for the 1941 model year, the first Ford L-6 (designated G-series) displaced  and produced , the same as the Flathead V-8 that year. Like the V-8, it was also a flathead or L-head engine. The G- and H-series engines were used in the full-sized Ford cars and trucks to replace the smaller  Flathead V8 that was used in the 1937 Ford. Ford discontinued production of the H-series engine for the 1951 model year.

254
A  version of the L-6 (designated the M-series or Rouge 254) was used from 1950 to 1953 in F6-series Ford trucks (COE, dump, truck-tractor, etc.), and small Ford school buses. They were also used in miscellaneous industrial applications, e.g., to power water pumps for irrigation purposes and within wine-producing farms to manage risk by  powering giant frost-control propellers on stands in the middle of rows of grapes.

Second generation

The second generation was a newly designed inline-six, produced from 1952 through 1964; it shared many parts with Ford Y-blocks such as the entire valve train and the problems associated with the Y-block's lubrication system. These engines have the exhaust and intake on the driver's side and the distributor on the passenger side. It is referred to as Mileage Maker or I-Block Mileage Maker (with the "I" referring to "inline") in the passenger cars and Cost Clipper in the trucks.

215
A completely new OHV I-6 was offered for the 1952–53 F-Series. It displaced  and produced . It was also used in the 1952–53 Ford full-sized cars.

223
The 223 I-6 was also used in 1963–1964 Ford trucks, which also used the Autolite 1100 carburetor with stamping C4TF-E and produced  with 206 ft-lb of torque, and Mercury Meteor-Monterey in 1961. The 223 was also used in Onan 30EC generator sets and possibly others.

262
A  I-6 version was also produced. The 262 I-6 was built from 1961 to 1964 for use in medium- and heavy-duty Ford trucks. This engine was also used for industrial applications.

Third generation

The third generation was produced at the Lima Engine plant in Lima, Ohio, from 1960 through 1984. Officially dubbed the Thriftpower Six, this engine line is sometimes referred to as the Falcon Six. Note that car companies, including Ford, switched from gross ratings to net horsepower and torque ratings in 1972 (mainly because of the emissions laws being enacted nationwide at the time), so changes in engine compression and emissions controls make comparing engines from various production years (especially pre-1972) difficult.

144

The  inline-six engine was first introduced in the 1960 Ford Falcon. The 144 was made from 1960 through 1964 and averaged  during the production run. This small six was the basis for all the Ford "Falcon" straight-six engines. The intake manifold on this series was cast integrally with the cylinder head (this design was also used by Chevrolet with some of their later third-generation inline-sixes, the older engines had separate manifolds); as a result, they could not be easily modified for greater power. This engine had four main bearings and can be identified by the three core plugs on the side of the block.
 
This engine was used in:
 1960 - 1964 Ford Falcon
 1960 - 1964 Ford Ranchero
 1960 - 1964 Mercury Comet
 1961 - 1964 Ford E-Series (Econoline)

170

In 1961, the  became an option for the Falcon and Comet lines. The original 1965 Ford Mustang used a  version from March (production start) through July 1964. The Econoline van and Ford Bronco received a heavier-duty version with mechanical valve lifters. This engine had four main bearings and can be identified by the three freeze (core) plugs on the side of the block. The 170 Special was dropped from production in 1972.

187
From 1965 to 1969, Ford Argentina produced a specific block similar to the earlier  (four main bearings,  stroke) but with a 
 bore.

200
The  inline-six model was introduced in the middle of 1963 with  bore and stroke, and shared the four main bearing design of the 170. Early 200s can be identified by three freeze plugs. Beginning in 1965, the 200s were upgraded to seven main bearings to reduce harmonic vibrations and increase durability. The Mustang continued to use the 200 as its base engine until it was dropped in 1971. Starting in 1966, a six-bolt bellhousing flange block was introduced. Beginning in 1980, one version of the 200 block was redesigned with a bell housing flange and a low-mount starter very similar to the low-mount starter 250 inline-six. This version is easily identified by starter location down by the oil pan rail and is referred to as the Big Bell 200. The big bell design is uncommon, but sought after by I-6 performance enthusiasts because it can be modified to accept a Ford small block V8 six bolt bell housing. There were concurrent high-mount starter 200 blocks made till 1983 model year, and they are more common than low-mount starter 200s.

When Ford launched the third-generation Fox body Mustang in 1979, the original engine lineup included the Cologne V6. The same engine was also offered in the hugely successful Ford of Europe Capri Mk II. The 2.8L V6 engine was a popular option for the US Mustang and the European Capri Mk II, and as a result, the Cologne engine plant could not meet the demand for engines for both continents. As a result, the Cologne 2.8L V6 was dropped from the Mustang's engine lineup in the middle of the 1979 production year and replaced with the 200 Falcon inline-six, which was then referred to as the 3.3L engine. The engine and front suspension K-member were transferred from the Fairmont, which helped reduce costs instead of having to redesign the Mustang for a different engine.

The 200 was used in the Ford Maverick and Mercury Comet and continued in the Ford Fairmont and Mercury Zephyr until they were discontinued at the end of the 1983 model year. The 1975–80 Ford Granada and Mercury Monarch offered the 200 inline-six as the standard engine.  For 1981–82 the Ford Granada was redesigned and common with an expanded line of Mercury Cougars which used the 200 inline-six as the standard engine.  From mid-year 1980 through 1982 the Ford Thunderbird and Mercury Cougar XR-7 used the 200 inline-six as the standard engine. The Ford LTD and Mercury Marquis, introduced in 1983 as the successors to the Granada and Cougar (non-XR7 models), carried over the 200 engine until it was replaced by the 3.8L Essex V6 for 1984.

Ford was also having problems meeting demand for its 2.3L OHC engine, which was used in a multitude of models worldwide. In anticipation of another engine shortage, the Ford engine plant in Lima, Ohio, which was already producing the 2.3L OHC engine, decided they could modify the Falcon inline six block casting molds to remove cylinders 4 and 5 to create a four-cylinder engine. A cast-iron high-swirl cylinder head was developed, and the motor was designated the 2.3L HSC to help differentiate it from the same displacement 2.3L OHC design. This motor shared many common parts with the 200, and it is common for persons rebuilding their 200 engines to use the 2.3L HSC pistons as a cheap replacement.

Applications:
1963–1967 Ford Ranchero
1963–1969 Ford Fairlane (Americas)
1964–1970 Ford Falcon (North America)
1965–1971 and 1979–1982 Ford Mustang
1968–1969 Ford Torino
1970–1977 Ford Maverick (Americas)
1975–1982 Ford Granada (North America)
1978–1983 Ford Fairmont
1973–1977 Ford Bronco
1980–1982 Ford Thunderbird (eighth generation)
1983  Ford LTD (Americas)
1964–1967 and 1971–1977 Mercury Comet
1975–1980 Mercury Monarch
1978–1983 Mercury Zephyr
1979–1982 Mercury Capri
1980–1982 Mercury Cougar
1983 Mercury Marquis

250

The  inline-six engine was offered in 1969 in the Mustang, and 1970 in compact Ford cars (Maverick). The Ford Granada and Mercury Monarch offered the 250 inline-six for the 1975–1980 model years, when it was replaced by the 200 inline-six.

This engine had seven main bearings, and can be identified by the five freeze (core) plugs on the side of the block. The block uses a low-mount starter and six bellhousing bolts, sharing its bellhousing pattern with the 302 and 351 Windsor V8s, late (1965–68) 289, early 4.6L V8, and the 240 and 300 inline-six. Production of the 250 ended in 1980.

Applications:
1968–1976 Ford Ranchero
1968–1973 Ford Torino
1969–1973 Ford Mustang
1970–1977 Ford Maverick (Americas)
1975–1980 Ford Granada (North America)
1972–1982 Ford Cortina
1968–1969 Mercury Comet
1972–1976 Mercury Montego
1975–1980 Mercury Monarch

Fourth generation

Produced at the Cleveland Engine plant in Brook Park, Ohio, from 1964 through 1996, the 240 and 300 inline-six engines are well known for their durability. Their simple design and rugged construction continue to endear these engines to a number of Ford enthusiasts to this day. The engine has earned the monikers "bulletproof" and "indestructible" by many. Popular legend holds that are numerous claims by owners who have purposely sought to destroy a Ford straight-six through intentionally abusive use, but who were unsuccessful in doing so.

One example of the engine's sturdy design is the fact that no timing chain or timing belt (both of which can break, causing unwanted downtime or even engine damage, although this is extremely unlikely in the case of a chain) is used. This generation of Ford Six was designed with long-wearing gears for that purpose instead. These engines also employed seven main bearings.

Both the 240 and the 300, no matter the application, used a single-barrel Autolite 1100/1101 (or Carter YF/A) carburetor until the introduction of electronic fuel injection in 1987. With proper gearing, many F-Series trucks and Broncos achieve .

The fuel economy of the 300 makes the engine a popular choice among truck enthusiasts that want both power and economy. The addition of performance parts (such as intake and exhaust manifolds with a four-barrel carburetor) place the engine power output near the same levels as the stock "HO" (High Output) version of the optional 351 V8, with little or no change in economy.

240
The  inline-six for 1965–1972 full-sized cars (continued to 1974 in fleet models) and 1965–1974 trucks and vans produced  (gross). In stationary service (generators and pumps) fueled by LPG or natural gas, this is known as the CSG-639.

300

The  six was first offered in the F-Series for 1965. The two engines are nearly identical; the differences are in the rotating assembly and combustion chamber sizes in the head (the heads are interchangeable). It produced  (gross). Power outputs were increased to roughly  during the early 1980s, before fuel injection was introduced. This became the primary engine of the line, eclipsing the 240. Unlike the Falcon engine, it featured separate intake and exhaust manifolds, which could be easily replaced with aftermarket manifolds offering the promise of even more power, through the installation of larger carburetors and a higher flowing exhaust system.

These engines were equipped with a higher flow HD (Heavy Duty) exhaust manifold and forged crankshafts and rods since the engines were going to be constantly working in the 3,000–4,000 rpm range. These rare yet effective manifolds had a much higher exhaust flow rate because many of these engines would spend hours at 3,000 rpm or more. Due to their straightforward and high flowing design, enthusiasts often seek these manifolds out because they allow turbochargers to be easily retrofitted to the engine.

Beginning in 1978, the engine displacement was advertised in metric, becoming "4.9 L." Fuel injection and other changes in 1987 pushed output up to  horsepower with an 8.8:1 compression ratio. Even though this engine was renowned for its durability, low-end torque, and ease of service, it was gradually phased out. Production ended in 1996, making it the last inline-six gasoline engine offered in a Ford car or light truck in North America. It was replaced by the 4.2L Essex V6 for 1997 in the radically redesigned F-150 and the E-150 and E-250. The 300 was mated to the Ford C6, E4OD, AOD, ZF S5-42 and S5-47 transmissions, as well as the Mazda built M5OD 5-speed manual transmission, and the Borg-Warner T18, Tremec RTS, and New Process NP435 4-speed manual transmissions.

Race car driver Scott Donohue raced a rally truck with a Ford 300 inline-six in it and won the Baja 1000 three times. This engine is also used by Stewart & Stevenson in the MA Baggage Tow Tractor, and Harlan in their standard tow tractors, as well as a multitude of other pieces of equipment, such as ski lifts, power generators, wood chippers, tractors, and, until they converted to diesel engines, most UPS trucks. In stationary service (generators and pumps) fueled with LPG or natural gas, this engine is known as the CSG-649.

Applications:
1965–1996 Ford F-Series (F-100, F-150, F-250, F-350, and F-600)
1968–1996 Ford E-Series (E-100, E-150, E-250, and E-350)
1980–1992 Ford Bronco

Ford Australia
Starting in 1960, Ford Australia used the same inline-six engines as offered in North America, featuring the 144 and 170 cu in pursuit models. The 144 was discontinued in late 1966. As in North America, a 200 cu in 'Super Pursuit' motor was added in February 1964. In 1968, the deck height of the design was increased to make room for increased crankshaft stroke, resulting in displacements of 188 and 221 cu in (badged 3.1 and 3.6 litres). They superseded the 170 and 200 engines in the lineup. The 188 and 221 also powered the Ford Falcon (Argentina) from 1970 to 1991.

In , Ford Australia enlarged the motors to 200 and 250 cu in. The head was of the same design as previous models, with an integral intake catering for a single-barrel Bendix-Stromberg carburettor. Also in 1970, the Falcon Inline 6, on both 200 and 250 cu in variants, became available on locally manufactured Ford Cortinas, Around this time, the company also developed the '2V' ('two venturi', or '2 barrel' in Ford terminology, reflecting a new 2-barrel carburettor as opposed to the previous single-barrel) cylinder head, which in all respects was similar to the previous integral "log head" intake, with the exception of a removable aluminium intake which mounted a Bendix-Stromberg WW two-barrel carburettor. To take advantage of the much improved breathing ability that the removable intake brought to the new head, the 250-2V also featured a much better breathing exhaust manifold.

For years, the 250-2V cylinder head was very popular for racing and many have been imported to North America, where owners of cars with the Falcon inline six have upgraded their engines with the better cylinder head.

In , Ford Australia updated the engines with a new cast-iron crossflow head design. Engine displacements remained 200 and 250 cu in, but were now badged 3.3 and 4.1 litres, respectively. These engines were offered in the Ford Falcon XC in Australia. Whereas the previous integral "log head" I-6 motor borrowed from the Ford FE engine family design, the new crossflow motor borrowed from the Ford Cleveland engine family. A common upgrade for a crossflow head engine is to use 351 Cleveland roller tip rocker arms.

Ford Australia updated the crossflow design in mid-1980 with a new aluminium head casting. The alloy head was used to improve warmup time and reduce fuel consumption and emissions. Until 1982, the engines were fitted with a single-barrel Bendix-Stromberg carburettor, but from March 1982 were fitted with a Weber two-barrel carburettor, which had improved fuel consumption over the single-barrel carburettor. The Weber carburettor engines were badged Alloy-Head II.

Later, a  fuel-injected version with direct-port fuel injection was offered in the XE Falcon, and was only available as an aluminium-head 4.1 L. The XF Falcon's 4.1 then received Ford's EEC-IV engine management system with Multi Point Electronic Fuel Injection (MP-EFI). The carburettor engine was still fitted standard, and EFI was optional. Changes to the carburettor-based engine were made to accommodate the EFI system. The compression ratio on the 4.1 L was 8.89:1. The cylinder head intake ports had been modified to provide clearance for the injectors, and a new intake manifold was designed and many other changes were made in the engine bay to accommodate the new fuel system.

Power at specified rpm (DIN) before '86 running on leaded fuel
3.3 L  @ 4100 rpm
4.1 L carburetor  @ 3750 rpm
4.1 L EFI engine  @ 4000 rpm
Torque at specified rpm (DIN) Pre '86 running on leaded fuel
3.3 L  @ 2500 rpm
4.1 L carburetor  @ 2400 rpm
4.1 L EFI engine  @ 3000 rpm
Power at specified rpm (DIN) ADR 37 compliant engine running on unleaded fuel
3.3 L  @ 4000 rpm
4.1 L carburetor  @ 3600 rpm
4.1 L EFI engine  @ 4000 rpm
Torque at specified rpm (DIN) ADR 37 compliant engine running on unleaded fuel
3.3 L  @ 2200 rpm
4.1 L carburetor  @ 2000 rpm
4.1 L EFI engine  @ 3000 rpm

In , the inline six engines underwent a major redesign for the EA Falcon and now featured a new single overhead cam (SOHC) crossflow aluminum head. The camshaft and auxiliary shaft are driven by a 'duplex' chain. The duplex chain drives the distributor and the oil pump shafts. The camshaft is supported on the cylinder head by using 'topless' bearings. Bearing liners are not used. The camshaft is held in position using valve spring pressure. Hydraulic lash adjusters mounted on the rocker arms are used to provide zero valve lash. As with all previous and current models, the block is cast iron, but with a reduction in the cylinder bore to try to reduce emissions.

The SOHC engines were offered as the 3.2 L (with throttle body injection) and the 3.9 L (with throttle body or multipoint fuel injection). In 1995, a dual resonance intake manifold for the EF series was introduced. Also for the EF series Falcon, the standard engine employed a high-energy coil-pack ignition system. However, the subsequent EL Falcon reverted to a distributor/coil ignition setup.

Ford Australia redesigned the I-6 again, naming it the Intech, in 1998 alongside the introduction of the Ford Falcon (AU), and increased the main bearing size and added a ladder style main stud girdle integral with the oil pan to increase low end rigidity. The engine also received variable camshaft timing technology in some XR6 models, Fairlane/LTD models and the Fairmont Ghia which allowed the ECU to advance or retard camshaft timing depending on engine speed, which results in a broader power band.
The Falcon Forte (base model) engine had a power rating of 157 kW, the sports XR6 model variants had either 164 kW (HO - High Output) or 172 kW (VCT) and the luxury-focused Fairmont Ghia had 168 kW (VCT).

Barra

In , the engine underwent a significant upgrade receiving dual overhead cams (DOHC) with variable cam timing and coil-on-plug ignition. The engine gained the nickname "Barra", named after the "Barramundi" code name used during the development of the Ford Falcon (BA).

Turbocharged versions were also manufactured.

Ford Australia's high-performance division, Ford Performance Vehicles (FPV), created even more powerful turbocharged variants. This engine, the Barra 310T, was the first Australian-built engine to achieve over 100 hp per litre.

The ultimate iteration of the Barra engine was installed in the limited-production FG X XR6 Sprint (limited to 500 units) of 2016. This engine produced  @ 6000rpm and  @ 2750 rpm.

Ford Australia had intended to discontinue production of the I-6 engine at their engine plant in Geelong in 2010 and replace it in the Falcon and Territory models with an imported V6 engine, although later reversed this decision in favour of upgrading the Barra to meet then-upcoming Euro IV emissions standards. This would prove to be only a temporary stay of execution as the Geelong factory eventually closed on 26 September 2016, following Ford's decision in May 2013 to discontinue the Falcon and Territory and cease manufacture of vehicles in Australia.

Ford Falcon (Australia) straight-six engines

References

External links

Straight-6
Straight-six engines
Gasoline engines by model